Yellow coneflower is a common name for several plants and may refer to:

Rudbeckia hirta, native to eastern and central North America
Rudbeckia pinnata, native to the central and eastern United States and Ontario
Echinacea paradoxa